The 1935 Villanova Wildcats football team represented the Villanova University during the 1935 college football season. The head coach was Harry Stuhldreher, coaching his eleventh season with the Wildcats. The team played their home games at Villanova Stadium in Villanova, Pennsylvania.

Schedule

References

Villanova
Villanova Wildcats football seasons
Villanova Wildcats football